The Mary Gibbs and Jesse H. Jones Reflection Pool is a reflecting pool in Houston's Hermann Park, in the U.S. state of Texas.

The design of the Houston Zoo's Reflection Pool is meant to be a replica of the Mary Gibbs and Jesse H. Jones Reflection Pool.

References

External links

 
 Points of Interest: Mary Gibbs and Jesse H. Jones Reflection Pool at the Hermann Park Conservancy

Hermann Park